The history of the Jews in Chile dates back to the arrival of Europeans to the country. Over time, Chile has received several contingents of Jewish immigrants. Currently, the Jewish community in Chile comes mainly from the migrations occurred in the 19th and 20th centuries, mostly of Ashkenazi background.

Chile is home to the third-largest Jewish community in South America. Chile has an estimated 18,300 Jews, according to the American Jewish Yearbook 2019, representing 0.1% of the total Chilean population. The total amount of Chileans with Jewish ancestry, however, is roughly 30,000 (defined as people having at least one Jewish parent or grandparent, and any spouse of such person).

Migration history

Spanish colonization and settlement 
The first Jews arrived in Chile with the Spanish conquistadors. They were Jewish converts to Catholicism because at the time of the Inquisition, they had to hide their Jewish origin. Most of that immigration occurred in the early years of the conquest. They fled religious persecution in Spain since the Inquisition had not been installed yet in the Americas. Diego García de Cáceres, faithful friend and executor of the founder of Santiago, Pedro de Valdivia, was one of them.

In colonial times, the most prominent Jewish character in Chile was the surgeon Francisco Maldonado da Silva, one of the first directors of the San Juan de Dios Hospital . Maldonado da Silva was an Argentine Jew born in San Miguel de Tucumán into a Sephardic family from Portugal. He was accused to the Tribunal of the Inquisition by her sisters, devout Christians, from attempting to convert them to Judaism. Maldonado declared openly Jew, and was sentenced to be burned alive in 1639. Entire Crypto-Jewish families, who had publicly converted to Catholicism but privately remained Jews, arrived. Like in the rest of Latin America, the original Jewish settlers did not retain their identity over the generations and were eventually assimilated into the broader majority of the Chilean Catholic society. As such, the Jewish community of Chile today only really begins with the Jewish immigrations of the 19th century.

Jewish immigration in the 19th century 
From 1840, decades after the abolition of the Inquisition in Chile, began the Jewish immigration to the country. The first Jews who arrived in Valparaíso were from Europe, especially from Germany and France. One of them, Manuel de Lima y Sola, was a man who became one of the founding members of the Fire Department of Valparaíso in 1851 and one of the founders of the Chilean freemasonry to create the first Masonic lodge, the "Unión Fraternal" two years later.

Jewish emigration in the 20th century 
During the turbulent Pinochet era, many Jews left Chile in the 1970s and 1980s. In 1961, the Jewish population was about 30,000, but by 1997 the population had dwindled to 15,000.

The 2012 Chilean census showed 16,294 Jews living in the country, marking an 8.8% increase from the decade before.

Community institutions 
Orthodox Judaism reaches approximately ten percent of Chile's Jewish community.

The Chabad movement was first established in Chile in 1981 and has since constructed synagogues, schools and recreational centers.

Notable Chilean Jews

See also 

Immigration to Chile
Religion in Chile
Benei Sión

References

External links 

 
Jews